Muhammad Wazir Khan (reigned 1834–1864) was the second ruler of the princely state of Tonk (in the present day Rajasthan state of India). Tonk

He was the son of Muhammad Amir Khan whom he succeeded. During the Indian Rebellion of 1857 he allied himself with the British and repulsed rebels.

References

Rohilla
Nawabs of Tonk
Nawabs of India
Indian Muslims
Indian people of Pashtun descent